William Marshall McCarthey (1841-1899) was an American politician. He served as the Mayor of Nashville, Tennessee from 1895 to 1897.

Biography
He was born in 1841 in Georgia.

He served as Mayor of Nashville from 1895 to 1897. He was a member of the American Protective Association, an anti-Catholic organization.

He was married to Hettie McCarthey and they had six daughters, Mollie, Madeline, Hettie, Lillie, Ordalia and Maggie, and two sons, Willie and Henry. He died on September 13, 1899. He is buried at Mount Olivet Cemetery.

References

1841 births
1895 deaths
Mayors of Nashville, Tennessee
19th-century American politicians
American Protective Association